

Qualified teams

Bracket

Semi-finals

Myanmar vs Vietnam

Thailand vs Indonesia

Bronze medal match

Vietnam vs Indonesia

Gold medal match
Poor finishing and excellent goalkeeping from Kyaw Zin Phyo kept Thailand off the sheet until the second half. Both teams named unchanged lineups which had emerged victorious in the semi-finals. They had met twice before the tournament in warm-up friendlies, Thailand won both 1–0 on 18 March 2015 and 4–0 on 19 May 2015. Thailand were completely dominant and Myanmar only had one shot on target all game, and outside effort by captain Nay Lin Tun in the fourteenth minute. In the sixth minute Nurul Sriyankem found Chananan Pombuppha but his effort was stopped by Kyaw. In the fifteenth minute Nurul blasted way over the bar despite being unmarked, and was later denied by Kyaw when his free-kick was saved. Rungrath Poomchantuek was unmarked in the thirty sixth minute but his header was straight at the Burmese goalkeeper. In what was the best chance of the first half in the 43rd minute Chanathip found Thitipan Puangchan with a great pass but the latter was denied by an even better save from the excellent Kyaw in goal. The second had begun much as the first, with Myanmar sitting deep and threatening on the break but Thailand in total control. Chananan really should have scored in the fifty-second minute but was once again denied by Kyaw. The goal was coming as Thailand finally made their dominance count, a Thai corner was cleared only as far as Tanaboon Kesarat, and the midfielder rifled his shot into the net. Chananan was still unable to score, as he was denied in the 58th and 62nd minute by the excellent Kyaw. Chananan finally did get his goal in the sixty-fourth as he ran onto Chanathip's defense-splitting pass and slotted the ball past the onrushing goalkeeper and into the bottom right corner. With that goal Chananan joined Sithu Aung and Võ Huy Toàn with five goals for the tournament. Substitute Pinyo Inpinit added gloss to the scoreline as he latched onto a superb lofted ball from his captain Sarach Yooyen and side-footed the ball past the rooted Zin Phyo.

Thailand set several records during the tournament. During the course of the completion the Thai team scored 24 goals and conceded only one. Not only that but every player in the 20 strong squad played at least 90 minutes, with 12 of those players scoring.
 For Myanmar under Kyi Lwin could also be proud, having spurred some real shocks with their victories over Indonesia, Singapore and Vietnam. The Burmese team can be especially pleased that they did well despite missing their most talented youth players such as superstar Aung Thu and also Than Paing, Nanda Kyaw, Nyein Chan Aung, and Kyaw Min Oo who were representing Myanmar at the 2015 FIFA U-20 World Cup.

Myanmar vs Thailand

References

Knockout stage